Rusdiansyah is an Indonesian footballer who currently plays for Persis Solo (LPIS) as a defender.

References
Rusdiansyah at goal.com

Indonesian footballers
1985 births
Living people
Association football defenders
People from Balikpapan
Sportspeople from East Kalimantan